Minuscule 380 (in the Gregory-Aland numbering), ε 547 (Soden), is a Greek minuscule manuscript of the New Testament, on parchment. It is dated by a colophon to the year 1499. 
It has marginalia.

Description 

The codex contains the text of the four Gospels on 202 parchment leaves. The text is written in one column per page, in 23 lines per page.

There is also a division according to the Ammonian Sections, with references to the Eusebian Canons (written below Ammonian Section numbers).

Text 

The Greek text of the codex is a representative of the Byzantine text-type. Hermann von Soden classified it to the textual family Kx. Aland placed it in Category V.
The Claremont Profile Method confirmed its Kx membership in Luke 1, Luke 10, and Luke 20. The text was corrected toward Π groups.

History 

The manuscript was written by Demetrius Moschus Lakon for Giovanni Francesco della Mirandola. The manuscript was added to the list of New Testament manuscripts by Scholz (1794-1852).

C. R. Gregory saw it in 1886.

The manuscript is currently housed at the Vatican Library (Vat. gr. 2139) in Rome.

See also 

 List of New Testament minuscules
 Biblical manuscript
 Textual criticism

References

Further reading 

 D. Harlfinger, Specimina griechischer Kopisten der Renaissance I (Berlin, 1974), 78

Greek New Testament minuscules
15th-century biblical manuscripts
Manuscripts of the Vatican Library